NBA Jam is a 3-on-3 basketball video game published by Acclaim Entertainment for the PlayStation 2 and Xbox in 2003. It is part of the NBA Jam series. The game was announced on May 12, 2003. The play-by-play is voiced by Tim Kitzrow. There was also originally to be a GameCube version of the game.

The game is based on the 2003–04 NBA season and features some of the NBA's best players from that season. After a series of more simulation-oriented Jam games, NBA Jam features fast-paced gameplay more akin to the arcade originals, although in a departure from the series' usual 2-on-2 formula, the teams are made up of three players instead. The game also features various courts and special teams, including all-star teams composed of various NBA legends. It is the last NBA Jam released by Acclaim, as the company became defunct the following year.

NBA Jam would also be the last Jam game released until Electronic Arts revived the franchise with its 2010 NBA Jam game.

Reception

The game received "average" reviews on both platforms according to the review aggregation website Metacritic.

References

External links

2003 video games
Acclaim Entertainment games
Cancelled GameCube games
NBA Jam
PlayStation 2 games
Xbox games
Video games developed in the United States